Species named black blind snake include:
 Epictia goudotii, a species of snake native to Middle America
 Gerrhopilus ater, a species of snake native to Asia